Robert "Bob" Skarphol (born October 22, 1945) is an American politician. He is a member of the North Dakota House of Representatives from the 2nd District, serving since 2000. He is a member of the Republican party. Skarphol also served in the House from 1993 to 1997.

References

1945 births
Living people
Republican Party members of the North Dakota House of Representatives
21st-century American politicians